Zoetis Inc. (/zō-EH-tis/) is an American drug company, the world's largest producer of medicine and vaccinations for pets and livestock. The company was a subsidiary of Pfizer, the world's largest drug maker, but with Pfizer's spinoff of its 83% interest in the firm it is now a completely independent company. The company directly markets its products in approximately 45 countries, and sells them in more than 100 countries. Operations outside the United States accounted for 50% of the total revenue. Contemporaneous with the spinoff in June 2013 S&P Dow Jones Indices announced that Zoetis would replace First Horizon National Corporation in the S&P 500 stock market index.

History

1950s to 2000s 

In the 1950s, Pfizer began research on several drugs, including oxytetracycline, which was found to be effective in livestock. In 1952, the Pfizer Agriculture Division opened a 732-acre research and development facility in Terre Haute, Indiana, called Vigo. By 1988 the division was renamed Pfizer Animal Health.

The 1995 acquisition of Norden Laboratories from GlaxoSmithKline expanded Pfizer's animal health division into small animal care, including domestic pets. Secondary research and development centres were opened in Kalamazoo, Michigan, in 2003. In the same year, Pfizer acquired Pharmacia Corporation for US$60 billion in stock options. Between 2007 and 2011, the company acquired Embrex Inc, Catapult Genetics, Bovigen, Wyeth, Fort Dodge Animal Health, Vetnex Animal Health Ltd, Synbiotics Corporation, Microtek, King Pharmaceuticals, and Alpharma.

2010s to present 
Plans to break away Pfizer Animal Health into a separate company were officially announced in 2012. The new firm was named Zoetis in allusion to the Latin-derived  zoological term zoetic, meaning "pertaining to life".

Zoetis Inc.'s revenues exceeded $4.2 billion in 2011 and $4.34 billion in 2012. The animal health industry worldwide is an estimated US$22 billion industry.

On May 22, 2013, The Wall Street Journal reported that Pfizer planned to sell its majority stake in the company. According to the report, shareholders will have the option to swap their Pfizer shares for Zoetis shares. The sell-off of Zoetis is consistent with Pfizer's recent decision to shed other non-pharmaceuticals subsidiaries in an effort to save costs, raise capital, and pay off debt. The company has announced that JPMorgan Chase, Bank of America, Merrill Lynch, Goldman Sachs & Co., and Morgan Stanley will be the lead underwriters.

In November 2014, activist investor Bill Ackman disclosed that Pershing Square Capital Management had taken an 8.5% stake in the company, amassing approximately 41.8 million shares, causing the share price to hit its highest price since the IPO. On  17 November, the company announced it would acquire a portfolio of pet drugs from Abbott Laboratories for approximately $255 million.

2012: IPO 
Records show that Pfizer officially filed for registration of a Class A stock with the U.S. Securities and Exchange Commission on August 10, 2012. Zoetis' IPO on February 1, 2013 sold 86.1 million shares for US$ 2.2 billion. Shares sharply rose 19% by the end of the trading day to $35.01 a share, up from $26. At the time, it was the largest IPO from a U.S. company since Facebook's $16 billion IPO on May 18, 2012. Pfizer retained 414 million Class B shares giving it an 83% controlling stake in the firm. Stock investors were attracted to the steep profit margin in proportion to revenue and consumer confidence in potential future growth of the subsidiary. The offering's lead underwriters were JPMorgan Chase, Bank of America Merrill Lynch and Morgan Stanley. Most of the money raised through the IPO was used to pay off existing Pfizer debt.

Acquisitions
In November 2015, the company announced it would acquire a developer of aquaculture treatments and diseases, Pharmaq, for $765 million. In 2017, Zoetis acquired Ireland-based Nexvet, a company with a biologics focused technology and product candidate pipeline.

In May 2018, the company announced its intention to acquire Abaxis for $1.9 billion in cash.

In August 2021, Zoetis announced it would buy Jurox, increasing the business' presence in New Zealand, the US, Canada and the UK.

In June 2022, Zoetis acquired Basepaws, a privately held genetics company, to strengthen its portfolio of precision animal health solutions.

Products 
Twenty-eight sites in 11 countries make up Zoetis manufacturing network, each facility designed to meet chemical and infectious agent safety regulatory requirements. Many R&D operations are co-located with manufacturing sites, a collaboration that allows bringing new products to market faster. Zoetis builds on six-decade Pfizer history and aims for high-tech innovative manufacturing technologies. 
Zoetis products include:

Cerenia
Convenia
Dectomax
Draxxin
Excede
Excenel
Histostat
Mycitracin
Palladia
Pirsue
A180
Revolution Pet Medicine
Rimadyl
Sileo
Simplicef
Slentrol
Stronghold
Synulox

References

External links 
 

Companies based in Morris County, New Jersey
Pharmaceutical companies established in 1952
Companies listed on the New York Stock Exchange
Research and development in the United States
Madison, New Jersey
Pharmaceutical companies based in New Jersey
Veterinary medicine companies
2013 initial public offerings
Corporate spin-offs
1952 establishments in Indiana
Pfizer
Veterinary medicine in the United States